Thane is a city in Maharashtra, India.

Thane may also refer to:

Titles 

 Thegn, or Thane, retainer and official of a king in a class of aristocracy ranging from a Baron, Count, Prince, to a King, in Scotland and in Scandinavia. The titles were also formerly used in medieval England.
 Thane (Scotland), a title given to a local royal official in Scotland
Thane of Cawdor, a title in the Peerage of Scotland and a character in Macbeth

Places 

 Thane, Maharashtra, India.
 Thane, Queensland, Australia
 Thane district, Maharashtra, India
 Thane
 Thane taluka
 Thane railway station
 Thane (Lok Sabha constituency)
 Thane (Vidhan Sabha constituency)
 Thane, Juneau, United States
 Qafë Thanë, Albania and Macedonia

Other uses 
 Thane (comics), a Marvel Comics character
 Thane (name), including lists of people with the given name or surname
 Cyclone Thane, in the North Indian Ocean in 2011
 Thane Krios, a character in the Mass Effect video game series
 , a Royal Navy escort carrier

See also

 Thana (disambiguation)
 Thanatos (disambiguation)
 Thain, a surname
 Thein, a name
 Thane Direct, a British home shopping TV channel